Teunis Garret Bergen (October 6, 1806 – April 24, 1881) was an American farmer and politician who served one term as a United States representative from New York from 1865 to 1867.

Biography
Born in Brooklyn, New York, Bergen was the son of Garrett and Jane Wyckoff Bergen and the second cousin of John Teunis Bergen, also a U. S. Representative from New York. He attended the common schools and Erasmus Hall Academy (in Flatbush). He married Elizabeth Roelof Van Brunt on December 19, 1827, and they had one son, Garrett T. Bergen. His family owned at least 46 enslaved people in 1810.

Bergen engaged in agricultural pursuits and surveying and was supervisor of New Utrecht, Kings County, New York, from 1836 to 1859. He was a member of the New York constitutional conventions in 1846, 1867, and 1868, and was a delegate to the Democratic National Conventions at Baltimore and Charleston in 1860.

Tenure in Congress 
Bergen was elected as a Democrat to the Thirty-ninth Congress and served as U. S. Representative for the second district of New York holding office from March 4, 1865, to March 3, 1867.  He was not a candidate for renomination in 1866 and resumed agricultural pursuits and surveying near New Utrecht, and also engaged in literary and historical work.

Military 
Having served as ensign, captain, adjutant, and lieutenant colonel, Bergen was colonel of the Two Hundred and Forty-first Regiment, New York State Militia (known as Kings County Troop).

Death
Bergen died in Brooklyn, Kings County, New York, on April 24, 1881 (age 74 years, 200 days). He is interred at Green-Wood Cemetery, Brooklyn, New York.

Credited Eponyms
New York City Public School 9 in Brooklyn, NY (PS 9 Teunis G. Bergen) was named after Teunis G. Bergen.  His name was also given to a street and two subway stations in Brooklyn, (the 2 and 3 trains running along Flatbush Ave and the F and G trains along Court Street).

The Teunis G. Bergen School was renamed in 2019 to Sarah Smith Garnet Public School. Named after Sarah J. Garnet the first Black woman to serve as a principal in NYC. The name change followed a movement to remove the slaveholding Bergen family name from a school whose students are 40 percent African American. An article surfaced from June 14, 1819, in which Teunis' uncle, Teunis J. Bergen, and Michael Bergen had offering a reward of $40 for the return of Sam and Dinah, an African American couple who had escaped from slavery on the Bergen estate along with their three-year-old child.

See also
 Hans Hansen Bergen

References

External links

1806 births
1881 deaths
Politicians from Brooklyn
American surveyors
19th-century American historians
19th-century American male writers
Burials at Green-Wood Cemetery
Bergen family
Democratic Party members of the United States House of Representatives from New York (state)
19th-century American politicians
Erasmus Hall High School alumni
American male non-fiction writers
Historians from New York (state)